Bayas is one of eight parishes (administrative divisions) in Castrillón, a municipality within the province and autonomous community of Asturias, in northern Spain.

Population
It has a population of 96 inhabitants (INE 2011) in 63 households.

Location
Bayas occupies an area of 6.25 km ². It is located in the northwest of the council, 8 km from the capital, Piedras Blancas. It is bordered on the north by the Cantabrian Sea, on the east by the parish of Naveces, on the south by Santiago del Monte, and on the west by the municipality of Soto del Barco.

Within the parish, there is the natural monument of the island of La Deva and the Bayas beach area.

Populations
According to the 2009 list, the parish is formed by the following populations:

Bayas (village) 43.576171°, - 6.024933°: 43 inhabitants.
Infiesta (locale) 43.569402° - 6.020905°: 34 inhabitants.
Muniellas (El Camín de Muniellas in Asturian) (locale): 0 inhabitants.
Navalón (locale) 43.572503° - 6.030425°: 32 inhabitants.
El Pino (El Pinu) (locale): 0 inhabitants.
El Plano (El Planu) (locale): 0 inhabitants.
La Roza (L'Arandona) (locale): 14 inhabitants.
El Sablón (El Camín de Sablón) (locale): 0 inhabitants.

Meanwhile, the village of Bayas is divided into the following districts:
El Cueto 43.577747° - 6.020833°: 29 inhabitants.
La Pedrera: 2 inhabitants.
El Padrón: 12 inhabitants.

References

Parishes in Castrillón